Danijel Radiček (born 9 July 1980) is a Croatian retired football midfielder.

Career
He had a spell in Austria, with fifth-tier SV Großpetersdorf.

References

External links
 
Danijel Radiček profile  at Nogometni Magazin 

1980 births
Living people
Sportspeople from Koprivnica
Association football midfielders
Croatian footballers
NK Slaven Belupo players
NK Koprivnica players
NK Varaždin players
Croatian Football League players
Austrian 2. Landesliga players
Croatian expatriate footballers
Expatriate footballers in Austria
Croatian expatriate sportspeople in Austria